Berrien Springs High School is a public, magnet high school in Berrien Springs, Michigan, United States. It serves grades 9-12 for the Berrien Springs Public Schools.

Athletics
The Berrien Springs Shamrocks compete in the Lakeland Conference. School colors are green and white. The following Michigan High School Athletic Association (MHSAA) sanctioned sports are offered:

Baseball (boys) 
Basketball (girls and boys) 
Competitive cheerleading (girls) 
Cross country (girls and boys) 
Football (boys) 
Golf (boys) 
Soccer (girls and boys) 
Softball (girls) 
Swim and dive (girls and boys) 
Track and field (girls and boys) 
Volleyball (girls) 
Wrestling (boys)

References

External links

Schools in Berrien County, Michigan
Public high schools in Michigan